Waghai railway station is a small railway station in Dang district, Gujarat, India. Its code is WGI. It serves Waghai town. The station consists of 1 platform. The platforms are not well sheltered. It lacks many facilities including water and sanitation. Two trains originate from here.

Trains

Following trains originate from Waghai railway station :

 09501/02 Waghai - Bilimora NG Passenger Special
 09072/71 Waghai - Bilimora NG Passenger Special

References

Railway stations in Dang district
Mumbai WR railway division